"You Got Me Rocking" is a song by English rock and roll band the Rolling Stones from their 1994 album, Voodoo Lounge. The song was released as a single in the UK in September 1994, where it reached  23 on the UK Singles Chart. It was also released as a single in the United States, reaching number 13 on the Billboard Bubbling Under Hot 100 chart in 1995. A recording from the 1997–1998 Bridges to Babylon Tour opened the 1998 live album No Security. It was also included on the Stones' 2002 career retrospective, Forty Licks.

Background and composition
Begun early in 1993, "You Got Me Rocking" was initially a blues flavoured number; bootlegs have Jagger and Richards working the song as a slower, blues flavoured ramble, with Jagger shouting the hook "you got me rocking". Changed to a straightforward rocker in the vein of "Start Me Up", the song quickly evolved as Richards made the transition from piano to guitar. The lyrics moved to a more upbeat tone, as singer Mick Jagger presents redemption from a series of career ending instances of various professionals:

The lyrics can be interpreted as an answer to the Rolling Stones' critics, who often deride the band for their advancing age. Recording on "You Got Me Rocking" lasted from mid-summer to early winter 1993, when final touches were put on.

Live performances
"You Got Me Rocking" is notable as it remains one of the Stones' most enduring live songs, a rarity for a late-career song. The song was performed some 50 times during the 2005–2006 A Bigger Bang Tour.

B-side
The B-side is the little-known "Jump on Top of Me", which also appears on the soundtrack to Prêt-à-Porter. "You Got Me Rocking" appeared on the soundtrack to The Replacements in 2000.

Track listings

 7-inch VS1518
"You Got Me Rocking"
"Jump on Top of Me"

 Cassette VSC1518
"You Got Me Rocking"
"Jump on Top of Me"

 CD VSCDE1518
"You Got Me Rocking"
"Jump on Top of Me"

 CD VSCDT1518
"You Got Me Rocking"
"Jump on Top of Me"
"You Got Me Rocking" (Perfecto Mix)
"You Got Me Rocking" (Sexy Disco Dub Mix)

 CD VSCDG1518 - digipak
"You Got Me Rocking"
"Jump on Top of Me"
"You Got Me Rocking" (Perfecto Mix)
"You Got Me Rocking" (Sexy Disco Dub Mix)

Charts

References

The Rolling Stones songs
1994 singles
1994 songs
Song recordings produced by Don Was
Song recordings produced by Jagger–Richards
Songs written by Jagger–Richards
Virgin Records singles